The Rakes were an English post-punk band formed in London in 2003. Their first album Capture/Release released in 2005, received a nine out of ten review in the NME and was rated 13th best album of the year in the same paper. The band cited in their influences the Specials, Siouxsie and the Banshees and Pulp. 

The band disbanded in October 2009, after six years.

History
The Rakes formed in 2002. Their debut album, Capture/Release, spawned the singles "22 Grand Job", "Work, Work, Work (Pub, Club, Sleep)", and "Retreat". Several of their singles appeared in the Top 40 of the UK Singles Chart and Capture/Release reached No. 32 in the UK Albums Chart. The final single release from Capture/Release, "All Too Human", was released in the UK on 27 February 2006 and reached their best chart position (No. 22).

The Rakes' second album, Ten New Messages, was released by V2 Records on 19 March 2007. This album was produced by Jim Abiss (who has also worked with Arctic Monkeys, Editors and Kasabian) and Brendan Lynch (who has worked with Primal Scream). It was recorded in Mayfair Studios in London during the autumn of 2006.

The band's third album, Klang, was recorded at Karl-Marx-Allee in Berlin in a studio that was the former East German government's centre for radio broadcasts.

The Rakes supported Franz Ferdinand on their You Could Have It So Much Better... tour during the winter of 2005. They toured the UK throughout January and February 2006, supported by White Rose Movement, Duels, Young Knives, Switches and Klaxons. They also completed their first tour of the UK since the release of Ten New Messages, including their biggest headline concert, a sold out show at Brixton Academy.

On 22 October 2009, The Rakes announced that the band was to split with immediate effect: "The Rakes have always been very adamant and proud of the fact that we give 100% to every gig we've ever played. If we can't give it everything then we won't do it. That was the rule we set ourselves from day one". In 2015 lead singer Alan Donohoe told NME "Being in The Rakes was an insane rollercoaster, but singing the same songs for seven years got boring in the end. And if you're doing something just because you can't imagine an alternative then you're not really living."

Drummer Lasse Petersen has since joined Wolf Gang.

Donohoe started a new solo project titled The Champagne Campaign and released the video for single Denis and Margaret in April 2013 before releasing the single for digital download on 13 May. However, the official website and Twitter account for The Champagne Campaign has since been taken down and the future of the project is uncertain. As of September 2015, Donohoe works for a Brighton-based company as a software developer.

Discography

Albums
 Capture/Release (2005)
 Ten New Messages (2007)
 Klang (2009)

EPs
 Retreat (2005)

References

External links
The Rakes interview on CC
First listen to The Rakes - 1989
Alan Donohoe interview
PopMatters interview (November 2005)
The Rakes Fuel TV interview

English indie rock groups
Musical groups from London
Post-punk revival music groups
Musical groups established in 2004
Musical groups disestablished in 2009
V2 Records artists
Dim Mak Records artists